These are the results of the men's quadruple sculls competition in rowing at the 2004 Summer Olympics in Athens, Greece. It was one of eight events in men's rowing that was held.

Heats
Fourteen boats raced in three heats on August 14.  The top three boats in each heat advanced to the semifinals, and the remaining boats moved to the repechage.

SF denotes qualification to semifinal
R denotes qualification to repechage

Heat 1

Heat 2

Heat 3

Repechage - August 17

: Ben Holbrook, Brett Wilkinson, Sloan DuRoss and Kent Smack, 5:46.54 -> Semifinal A/B
: Simon Stürm, Christian Stofer, Olivier Gremaud and Florian Stofer, 5:47.94 -> Semifinal A/B
: Simon Cottle, Alan Campbell, Peter Gardner and Peter Wells, 5:48.65 -> Semifinal A/B
: Xavier Philippe, Cédric Berrest, Jonathan Coeffic and Frédéric Perrier, 5:50.83

Semifinals - August 19

Semifinal A
: Adam Bronikowski, Marek Kolbowicz, Sławomir Kruszkowski and Adam Korol, 5:42.63 -> Final A
: André Willms, Stefan Volkert, Marco Geisler and Robert Sens, 5:42.85 -> Final A
: Sergij Grin, Serhiy Biloushchenko, Oleh Lykov and Leonid Shaposhnykov, 5:44.00 -> Final A
: Scott Brennan, David Crawshay, Duncan Free and Shaun Coulton, 5:45.45 -> Final B
: Alessandro Corona, Simone Venier, Federico Gattinoni and Simone Raineri, 5:47.38 -> Final B
: Simon Cottle, Alan Campbell, Peter Gardner and Peter Wells, 5:48.52 -> Final B

Semifinal B
: David Kopřiva, Tomáš Karas, Jakub Hanák and David Jirka, 5:42.73 -> Final A
: Sergey Fedorovtsev, Igor Kravtsov, Aleksey Svirin and Nikolay Spinyov, 5:44.08 -> Final A
: Valery Radzevich, Stanislau Shcharbachenia, Pavel Shurmei and Andrei Pliashkou, 5:44.70 -> Final A
: Oleg Vinogradov, Igor Kuzmin, Andrei Šilin and Andrei Jämsä, 5:44.90 -> Final B
: Ben Holbrook, Brett Wilkinson, Sloan DuRoss and Kent Smack, 5:46.65 -> Final B
: Simon Stürm, Christian Stofer, Olivier Gremaud and Florian Stofer, 5:48.74 -> Final B

Finals

Final A - August 22
: Sergey Fedorovtsev, Igor Kravtsov, Aleksey Svirin and Nikolay Spinyov, 5:56.85
: David Kopřiva, Tomáš Karas, Jakub Hanák and David Jirka, 5:57.43 
: Sergij Grin, Serhiy Biloushchenko, Oleh Lykov and Leonid Shaposhnykov, 5:58.87
: Adam Bronikowski, Marek Kolbowicz, Sławomir Kruszkowski and Adam Korol, 5:58.94
: André Willms, Stefan Volkert, Marco Geisler and Robert Sens, 6:07.04
: Valery Radzevich, Stanislau Shcharbachenia, Pavel Shurmei and Andrei Pliashkou, 6:09.33

Final B - August 21
: Scott Brennan, David Crawshay, Duncan Free and Shaun Coulton, 6:02.31
: Simon Stürm, Christian Stofer, Olivier Gremaud and Florian Stofer, 6:04.53
: Oleg Vinogradov, Igor Kuzmin, Andrei Šilin and Andrei Jämsä, 6:05.11
: Alessandro Corona, Simone Venier, Federico Gattinoni and Simone Raineri, 6:06.91
: Ben Holbrook, Brett Wilkinson, Sloan DuRoss and Kent Smack, 6:07.83
: Simon Cottle, Alan Campbell, Peter Gardner and Peter Wells, 6:07.87

References

External links
Official Olympic Report

Men's Quadruple Sculls
Men's events at the 2004 Summer Olympics